The Normandie Apartments is a historic building located in the Near South Side neighborhood of Omaha, Nebraska, United States.

It was designed by architect Frederick A. Henninger.

References

National Register of Historic Places in Omaha, Nebraska
Residential buildings on the National Register of Historic Places in Nebraska
Apartment buildings in Omaha, Nebraska